The Germans of Romania represent one of the most significant historical ethnic minorities of Romania, both nowadays and during its past as well, stretching back in time to its foundation as the Kingdom of Romania (and even before as principality) in the late 19th century.

Throughout the interwar period, the total number of ethnic Germans in this country amounted to as much as  800,000 (according to some sources and estimates dating to 1939, just on the verge of World War II), a figure which has subsequently drastically fallen to  36,000 (according to the 2011 census) and dropped even more to  22,900 (as per the 2021 Romanian census, postponed one year because of the COVID-19 pandemic and conducted in 2022).

Following the decreasing trend of the overall population of Romania, the German community of the country is expected to continue shrinking in numbers as well, as it has already been officially reported by the partial results of the 2021 census.

Overview and classification of Romanian-Germans 

The Germans of Romania (or Romanian-Germans) are not a single, unitary, homogeneous group, but rather a series of various regional sub-groups, each with their different culture, traditions, folklore, dialect or dialects, and history.

This claim stems from the fact that various German-speaking populations had previously arrived in the territory of present-day Romania in different waves or stages of settlement, initially starting with the High Middle Ages, firstly to southern and northeastern Transylvania, Kingdom of Hungary (some of them even crossing the outer Carpathians to neighbouring Moldavia and Wallachia), then subsequently during the Modern Age in other Habsburg-ruled lands (such as Bukovina, at the time part of Cisleithania, or the Banat). Subsequently, the Romanian Old Kingdom was also colonized by Germans, firstly in Dobruja and then gradually in Moldavia and Wallachia.

In order to understand their language, culture, customs, and history, the Germans of Romania must be regarded as the following independent sub-groups:

 Transylvanian Saxons – the largest and oldest German community in the territory of modern-day Romania (often simply equated with all Romanian-Germans);
 Transylvanian Landlers – expelled Protestants (Evangelical Lutherans) from the region of Salzkammergut, contemporary Austria to southern Transylvania during the 18th century;
 Most Banat Swabians as well as the entirety of the Sathmar Swabians – both representing sub-groups of the Danube Swabians in Romania;
 The Banat Highland Germans;
 Bukovina Germans – once with a sizable or overwhelming demographic presence in all urban centres from the historical region of Bukovina (more specifically Suceava, Gura Humorului, Siret, Rădăuți, Vatra Dornei, and Câmpulung Moldovenesc) or some rural areas of the nowadays Suceava County in northeastern Romania; equally indigenous to Cernăuți and contemporary Chernivtsi province in western Ukraine between the years  1780–1940. Moreover, even to this date, Suceava County is one of the Romanian counties with some of the most significant amount of ethnic Germans in the country;
 Zipser Germans, mostly from Maramureş (including Borșa and Vişeu), but also with a smaller presence in southern and south-western Bukovina beginning in the 18th century;
 Regat Germans (including the Dobrujan Germans);
 Bessarabia Germans, Romanian citizens for the period 1918–1940, indigenous to Budjak in southern Bessarabia;
 Alsatians as well as small groups of Walsers vintners who also settled in Banat from Alsace, Lorraine, and Switzerland at the invitation of the Austro-Hungarian Empire in the 19th century (though they were not only Alemannic-speaking Swiss but also French and Italian); Subsequently, these settlers came to be known as 'Français du Banat' (i.e. 'Banat French').

History

Settlement during the High Middle Ages 

While an ancient Germanic presence on the territory of present-day Romania can be traced back to late antiquity and is represented by such migratory peoples as the Buri, Vandals, Goths (more specifically Visigoths), or the Gepids, the first waves of ethnic Germans on the territory of modern Romania came during the High Middle Ages, firstly to Transylvania (then part of the Kingdom of Hungary) and then to the neighbouring and emerging medieval principalities of Moldavia and Wallachia. The first major German group to arrive and settle in what is now Romania were the Transylvanian Saxons, partly under the protection of the Teutonic Knights, who came to Transylvania (meaning seven cities/citadels, i.e. from the seven fortified medieval cities/citadels which they founded) at the request of Hungarian King Géza II during the late 12th century. The main tasks of these settlers was to develop the areas of Transylvania where they settled as well as to defend them, and, implicitly, the rest of the Kingdom of Hungary, from the invading incursions of the migratory Asian peoples such as the Cumans, the Pechenegs, or, ultimately, the Mongols and then the Tatars. Later on, the Transylvanian Saxons further fortified both their rural and urban settlements agains the invading Ottoman Empire.

Slowly but steadily, the Saxon colonists managed to build solid and prosperous communities in the Carpathian Basin, more specifically in south-eastern, southern, and north-eastern Transylvania. These Transylvanian Saxons are very tied with their initial origin which stems from Western Europe, more specifically from Luxembourg and the Rhine-Moselle river valley. Their dialect, Transylvanian Saxon, is a strong testimony to this as it reflects many similarities with Luxembourgish.

Subsequently, as the Teutonic Knights left Transylvania (forced by the Hungarian rulership), the Transylvanian Saxon colonists remained and were given more rights through local autonomies, according to Diploma Andreanum issued by Andrew II of Hungary in the early 13th century. Their autonomous lands were later known as the 'Royal Lands' or 'Saxon Lands'.

In these lands, they lived together with the Romanian ethnic majority as well as with the Hungarians (who formed a significant minority). Eventually, they also sporadically rebelled against the Hungarian rulership, most notably in the proximity of Rupea (Transylvanian Saxon: Räppes) led by graf Henning of Petersdorf/Petrești in 1324.

Across the Carpathians, the Saxons settled along with the Romanians in Wallachia and Moldavia and contributed to the establishment of the first major urban centres and capitals of these two Romanian medieval principalities. Noteworthy towns and medieval capitals co-founded by Saxons include Baia in present-day Suceava County or Târgu Neamț in Neamț County as well as Târgoviște in Dâmbovița County or Câmpulung Muscel in Argeș County. Here they brought urbanisation and German laws as they did in Suceava as well, in which the local administration had operated for some time under the Magdeburg law, just like Siret, Baia, or Neamț. They even briefly served as Schultheiß, or the equivalent of the administrative title of medieval mayor in these communities. Nonetheless, along with the passing of time, the Saxons were assimilated in the larger Romanian communities of Romanians, both of the Wallchians and Moldavians.

Back in Transylvania, they managed to thoroughly fortify their villages and towns. In bygone times, there used to be as many as 300 (or approximately 300) villages with fortified churches built by the Transylvanian Saxons. Now their number is close to half, but among these there are many very well preserved ones which are both UNESCO-recognized (as World Heritage Sites) and important tourist destinations in Romania.

Settlement during the Modern Age 

During the Modern Age, other groups of Germans commenced to arrive and settle parts of contemporary Romania, more specifically in the historical regions of Bukovina, Banat, and once more in Transylvania. As the Kingdom of Hungary became weakened by the Ottoman wars and the Habsburgs were on the rise and continuously expanding their domains eastward, larger groups of Bukovina Germans, Banat Swabians, and Zipser Germans settled the aforementioned Romanian historical regions, mainly for economic and socio-demographic reasons. In Transylvania, other groups of Transylvanian Saxons settled there along with expelled Protestants from Salzkammergut, Austria during Empress Maria Theresa's reign to Sibiu region, Evangelical Lutheran settlers henceforth known as Transylvanian Landlers or, simply, landlers.

At the same time, during the 19th century, in the Romanian Old Kingdom, concomitantly with the crowing of King Carol I, a large influx of German settlers came to Muntenia and Oltenia. These Germans are known as Regat Germans. In addition, Germans also settled in Dobruja and this group is known as Dobrujan Germans.

At around the same time, in Bessarabia, then part of the Russian Empire, larger numbers of German settlers established colonies in preponderantly in Budjak, a constituent historical region of Bessarabia situated in its south towards the Danube's end to the Black Sea. These settlers were requested by the then imperial Russian authorities in order to develop the agriculture of the land and boost the region's economy as well as to instill urbanisation.

As the Modern Age came to an end, gradually so did the privileged class status of the Saxons in Transylvania which eventually drew them closer to Romania and voting the declaration of union of Transylvania with the Kingdom of Romania in the wake of World War I in 1918. Other groups of Germans from other previously Austrian-ruled Romanian historical regions (and the previously Russian-ruled historical region of Bessarabia) also voted for the union of their respective regions with the Kingdom of Romania from a wide variety of reasons. One of the most important reason was that the Romanian monarchy was also German in origin, being a branch of the House of Hohenzollern from the principality of Hohenzollern-Sigmaringen in Swabia.

Recent history (20th century onwards) 

Between the two World Wars, namely in 1925,  20,000 Swabians from Timiș County were relocated to neighbouring Arad County in order to create an ethnic balance in the latter administrative unit. Subsequently, huge numbers of both Transylvanian Saxons and Banat Swabians (ranging between  67,000 to 89,000 in total) were deported to the Soviet Union for forced labour after World War II, as a war compensation to the Soviets, despite the diplomatic efforts of Transylvanian Saxon politician Hans Otto Roth. Later during the 1950s, the Bărăgan deportations forcibly relocated many from near the Yugoslav border to the Bărăgan Plain. Survivors of both groups generally returned, but had often lost their properties in the process.

In addition, the once influential Bukovina German community also drastically dwindled in numbers, primarily as of the cause of the Heim ins Reich population transfer, leaving only several thousands of ethnic Germans in southern Bukovina (or present-day Suceava County) after the end of World War II. As communism paved its way in Romania, most of the remaining Bukovina Germans decided to gradually leave the country for West Germany up until 1989 (and even beyond), as it was the case of the entire German community of the country for that matter.

Furthermore, during the  1970s and 1980s, tens of thousands of other Romanian-Germans were 'bought back' by the West German government under a program to reunite families - and following the collapse of Nicolae Ceaușescu's regime in December 1989, around 200,000 Germans left their homes in Romania. During communist times, there have been several significant German-speaking opposition groups to the Romanian communist state, among which most notably there was Aktionsgruppe Banat, a literary society constituted in Banat by intellectual representatives of the local Swabian community (including, most notably, writer Richard Wagner). Overall, regarding the many Germans which were bought per capita by the West German government, the communist Romanian state was quite greedy in requesting more German marks for them, as in the words of former German chancellor Helmut Kohl, also former leader of the Christian Democratic Union (CDU).

Recent developments (21st century onwards) 

Eventually, although the German minority in Romania has dwindled in numbers to a considerable extent since the fall of the Iron Curtain, the few but well organised Romanian-Germans who decided to remain in the country after the 1989 revolution are respected and regarded by many of their fellow ethnic Romanian countrymen as a hard-working, thorough, and practical community which contributed in many positive regards to the local culture and history of, most notably, Transylvania, Banat, and Bukovina, where the largest German-speaking groups once lived alongside the Romanian ethnic majority.

Furthermore, the bilateral political and cultural relationships between post–1989 Romania and the unified Federal Republic of Germany have seen a continuous positive evolution since the signing of a friendship treaty between the two countries in 1992. Additionally, on the occasion of the election of Frank-Walter Steinmeier as President of Germany in 2017, current Romanian president Klaus Johannis stated, among others, that: "[...] Last but not least, there is a profound friendship bounding the Romanians and the Germans, thanks mainly to the centuries-long cohabitation between the Romanians, Saxons, and Swabians in Transylvania, Banat, and Bukovina."

Contributions to Romanian culture 

The German community in Romania has been actively and consistently contributing to the culture of the country. Notable examples include:

 Romanian architecture (e.g. the picturesque Transylvanian villages with fortified churches, known in German as kirchenburgen), or some of the most renowned castles as well as several medieval town centers with local markets, all of them highly popular touristic attractions);
 Romanian language (where approximately 3% of the words in the Romanian lexis are of German origin, mainly stemming from the influence of the Transylvanian Saxons and, later on, that of Austrians);
 Romanian literature (the first letter written in Romanian was addressed to the former early 16th century mayor of Kronstadt, Johannes Benkner, and the first Romanian-language book was printed in Sibiu;
 The collections of Ottoman rugs kept in Transylvania inside several fortified churches (known as Transylvanian rugs) are associated with the Transylvanian Saxon Evangelical Lutherans.

Royal House of Hohenzollern-Sigmaringen in Romania 

In the time of Romania's transition from a middle-sized principality to a larger kingdom, members of the German House of Hohenzollern (stemming from the Swabian Principality of Hohenzollern-Sigmaringen, part of contemporary Baden-Württemberg in south-western Germany) reigned initially over the Danubian United Principalities of Moldavia and Wallachia and then, eventually, also over the unified Kingdom of Romania both during the 19th and 20th centuries. Consequently, the ruling Romanian monarchs who were part of this dynastic branch were the following ones:

Pretenders to the throne of Romania (after 1947, when King Michael I was forced to abdicate by the communists):

Demographics

Comparative demographic table (1930–2011)

1941 Romanian censuses 

In 1941, the initial number of all ethnic Germans in Romania amounted to as much as 542,325. Subsequently, however, in December 1941, after Romania created, incorporated, and administered the Transnistria Governorate, the total number of ethnic Germans increased to 674,307, most notably along with the newly registered Black Sea Germans, solely for the short period between 1941 and 1944. It is also important to note the fact that the Germans constituted the second most numerous ethnic group in Romania at that time, after the Romanians, accounting for 4.01% (in April) respectively 3.53% (in December) of the total population.

Population statistics by settlement (2011) 

The data displayed in the table below highlights notable settlements (of at least 1%) of the German minority in Romania according to the 2011 Romanian census. Note that some particular figures might represent a rough estimate.

Population as of 2011 by county 

Below is represented the notable German minority population (of at least 1%) for some counties, according to the 2011 census.

2022 Romanian census data 

As per the 2021 Romanian census, there are only  22,900 Germans still left in Romania, a notable decrease from the latest census of 2011. In addition, 0.10 of all Romanian citizens reported German as their first/native language (or 15,943 people), therefore making it one of the least spoken native languages (and also of any ethnic minority overall) in Romania.

Administration, official representation, and politics 

In the wake of World War I, the German minority in unified Romania had been represented by a number of political parties which gradually gained parliamentary presence during the early to mid-early 20th century, more specifically the Swabian Group, the Group of Transylvanian Saxons, the German Party (which, under Rudolf Brandsch, briefly formed an electoral alliance known as the Hungarian German Bloc with the Magyar Party for the 1927 Romanian general election), and the German People's Party (the latter two having a national socialist political orientation after 1930). In stark contrast to the political mutation of both aforementioned parties, the Anti-Fascist Committee of German Workers in Romania was formed shortly thereafter as an anti-fascist and democratic counterpart. After the end of World War II, all of the political parties representing the German minority in Romania were either disbanded or ceased to exist.

Subsequently, just after the Romanian Revolution, the entire German-speaking community in post-1989 Romania has been represented at official level by the Democratic Forum of Germans in Romania, both in local politics and in central/parliamentary politics. The forum is therefore a political platform which has a centrist ideology aiming to support the rights of the German minority in Romania.

Since 1989, the FDGR/DFDR has competed both in local and legislative elections, cooperating in the process with two historical parties of the Romanian politics, namely the National Liberal Party (PNL) and the Christian Democratic National Peasants' Party (PNȚCD), most notably at local administrative level, in cities such as Sibiu, Timișoara, or Baia Mare.

Until 1 January 2007 (i.e. the date of accession of Romania to the European Union), the FDGR/DFDR was also an observing member of the European Parliament (EU), briefly affiliated with the European People's Party (EPP), between January and November of the same year, with only one seat occupied by member and current deputy Ovidiu Victor Ganț.

Religion 

The vast majority of the Romanian-Germans are either Roman Catholic or Protestant (i.e. Evangelical Lutheran). The Evangelical Lutherans pertain to the Evangelical Church of the Augsburg Confession.

Culture and education 

In 1922, all political representatives of the German community in Romania founded the Cultural League of Germans in Sibiu/Hermannstadt which was initially led by Richard Csaki. The league was in charge of organizing post-university summer courses, sending books, and providing teaching material through various lecturers in the settlements inhabited by ethnic Germans.

Nowadays, there are two German-language schools in Bucharest, namely Deutsche Schule Bukarest and Deutsches Goethe-Kolleg Bukarest. The Deutsche Schule Bukarest serves Kinderkrippe (nursery), Kindergarten, Grundschule (elementary school), and Gymnasium (high school).

In Timișoara, the Nikolaus Lenau High School was founded during the late 19th century. It was named this way in reference to Nikolaus Lenau, a Banat Swabian Romanticist poet. Nowadays, the Nikolaus Lenau High School is considered the most important of its kind from Banat.

In Sibiu/Hermannstadt, the Samuel von Brukenthal National College is the oldest German-language school from Romania (recorded as early as the 14th century), being also classified as a historical monument. It was subsequently renamed this way in reference to baron Samuel von Brukenthal, a Transylvanian Saxon aristocrat. Additionally, there is one Goethe Institut cultural  centre based in Bucharest as well as five Deutsche Kultzertrum based in Iași, Brașov, Cluj-Napoca, Timișoara, and Sibiu.

In Brașov/Kronstadt, the German-language school is the Johannes Honterus National College, named after the renowned great 16th century Transylvanian Saxon scholar and humanist Johannes Honterus.

The German State Theatre Timișoara is one of the oldest state theaters in Romania.

Media 

The Allgemeine Deutsche Zeitung für Rumänien (ADZ) is the daily German-language newspaper in contemporary Romania. To this day, it is the only German-language newspaper published in Eastern Europe. Regional German-language publications also include the Neue Banater Zeitung in Banat and the Hermannstädter Zeitung for the town of Sibiu. Previously, in the passing of time, other historical German-language newspapers included: Arbeiter-Zeitung, Temeswarer Nachrichten (the first German-language newspaper published in Southaestern Europe), and Banater Arbeiter-Presse in Banat, Vorwärts in Bukovina, and Neuer Weg in Bucharest.

On the Romanian public TV channel TVR, the show of the German minority in Romania is called Akzente and airs quite regularly. It celebrated its 50th anniversary in December 2019. The show is dubbed in standard German (i.e. Hochdeutsch) and subtitled in Romanian as well.

Gallery

See also 

 Germany–Romania relations
 Germany–Moldova relations
 List of ambassadors of Germany to Romania
 Romanians in Germany
 Transylvanian Saxon dialect
 Transylvanian Saxon cuisine
 Villages with fortified churches in Transylvania
 List of fortified churches in Transylvania
 List of Transylvanian Saxon localities
 Group of Transylvanian Saxons
 List of Transylvanian Saxons
 Sibiu Lutheran Cathedral
 Siebenbürgenlied
 Transylvanian Museum (in Gundelsheim, Baden-Württemberg, south-western Germany)
 Association of Transylvanian Saxons in Germany
 German culture
 Geographical distribution of German speakers

External links 

 Germanii din România: între nazism și stalinism by William Totok on Observatorul Cultural (in Romanian)
 Archiving family memories and dreams – stories about the German minorities in Romania (with many archive images; English/German) by Gerlinde Schuller

Further reading 

 Povești din folclorul germanilor din România by Roland Schenn, Corint publishing house, 2014 (in Romanian)
 Meschendorf by Jessica Klein (in English and German)
 The Rise and Fall of Saxon Transylvania by Cătălin Gruia (in English)

Notes

References 

German diaspora in Europe
Ethnic German groups in Romania
Romanian people of German descent
Romanian people of Austrian descent
Germany–Romania relations